Sayeeda Hussain Warsi, Baroness Warsi,  (born 28 March 1971) is a British lawyer, politician, and member of the House of Lords who served as co-Chairwoman of the Conservative Party from 2010 to 2012. She served in the Cameron–Clegg coalition, first as the Minister without portfolio between 2010 and 2012, then as the Minister of State for the Foreign and Commonwealth Office (styled as "Senior Minister of State") and as the Minister of State for Faith and Communities, until her resignation citing her disagreement with the Government's policy relating to the Israel–Gaza conflict in August 2014.

Warsi grew up in a family of Pakistani Muslim immigrants living in West Yorkshire. She became a solicitor with the Crown Prosecution Service (CPS). In 2004, she left the CPS to stand, unsuccessfully, for election to the House of Commons.

After being raised to the peerage in 2007, Warsi served as Shadow Minister for Community Cohesion and Social Action. She became the first Muslim to serve as a Cabinet Minister.

Early life and career
Warsi is the second of five daughters born in Dewsbury, West Riding of Yorkshire to Pakistani immigrants from Bewal, Gujar Khan; her ancestors are from southern Punjab. Her father, Safdar Hussain, is owner of a bed manufacturing company, with a turnover of £2 million a year, who started life as a mill worker and a bus driver. Warsi has said that her father's success led her to adopting Conservative principles.

Warsi was educated at Birkdale High School, Dewsbury College (now Kirklees College), and the University of Leeds. She attended the College of Law, York (now the University of Law), and completed her professional legal training thereafter with both the Crown Prosecution Service and the Home Office Immigration Department. After qualifying as a solicitor in 1996, she worked for the Conservative MP for Dewsbury, John Whitfield, at Whitfield Hallam Goodall Solicitors, and then set up a practice in Dewsbury.

Political career
Warsi was the Conservative parliamentary candidate for Dewsbury at the 2005 general election, having been added to the Conservative Party A-List for priority candidates, and thereby becoming the first Muslim woman to be selected by the Conservatives.

Although she was unsuccessful in her 2005 election bid, she served as a Special Adviser to Michael Howard for Community Relations, and was appointed by David Cameron as Vice Chair of the Conservative Party with specific responsibility for cities.

House of Lords
On 2 July 2007, Warsi was appointed Shadow Minister for Community Cohesion. To enable her to fulfil this post, she was created a life peer as Baroness Warsi, of Dewsbury in the County of West Yorkshire, on 11 October 2007 and was introduced in the House of Lords on 15 October 2007. On joining the House of Lords, she became its youngest member.

On 1 December 2007, Warsi travelled to Khartoum, with the Labour peer Lord Ahmed, to mediate in the Sudanese teddy bear blasphemy case (a British citizen teaching at Unity High School had been prosecuted and jailed for insulting Islam after allowing her class to name a teddy bear Muhammad). Although the peers' meeting with Sudanese President Omar al-Bashir did not lead directly to Gillian Gibbons being pardoned, it is acknowledged that, along with the enormous efforts made by her family, friends, and others, it was a helpful contribution to her release. Gibbons' son thanked Warsi and Ahmed for "their hard work behind the scenes" and the Prime Minister, Gordon Brown, praised both peers, saying "I applaud the particular efforts of Lord Ahmed and Baroness Warsi in securing her freedom." The Guardian newspaper referred to the incident as "Tory Peer's Triumph".

In government

Minister without Portfolio

On 12 May 2010, David Cameron appointed Warsi as Minister without Portfolio in Cabinet, when she succeeded Eric Pickles as Chairman of the Conservative Party. This appointment made Warsi the first Muslim woman to serve in the Cabinet. Warsi was sworn into the Privy Council the next day.

Cabinet reshuffle
Ahead of David Cameron's first Cabinet reshuffle in 2012, Warsi told The Daily Telegraph: "If I genuinely had a choice, I would like to stay doing what I'm doing." Speaking in Tampa Bay, Florida, where she had been attending the United States' Republican Party Convention, Warsi said the Prime Minister knew her strengths and weaknesses. She said the Party needed more votes from people in urban areas and more women. She said: "If you look at the demographics, at where we need to be at the next election, we need more people in the North voting for us, more of what they call here blue collar workers and I call the white working class. We need more people from urban areas voting for us, more people who are not white and more women. I play that back and think, I'm a woman, I'm not white, I'm from an urban area, I'm from the North, I'm working class—I kind of fit the bill. All the groups that we're aiming for are groups that I'm familiar with. I believe you've got to have the right people in the right job," she added.

In the same interview, she said that she was angry some viewed hers "as a tokenistic appointment". Lord Ashcroft found "at the 2010 election, only 16% of ethnic minority voters supported the Conservatives. More than two thirds voted Labour. Not being white was the single best predictor that somebody would not vote Conservative. The gulf between the Conservative Party and ethnic minorities is a well-known feature of British politics. It persists in spite of the Tories' efforts in recent years to reach beyond their core voters." In the event, on 4 September 2012, Warsi was appointed to the restyled post of "Senior Minister of State" in the Foreign Office and Minister for Faith and Communities in the Department of Communities and Local Government (a role created specifically for her in a ministry she had shadowed in Opposition). Warsi announced she had been removed as Party Chairman via Twitter, tweeting, "It's been a privilege and an honour to serve my party as co-chairman, signing off @ToryChairman".

Minister in UK

Minister of State

At the Foreign Office she was responsible for:
Afghanistan, Pakistan, Bangladesh
Central Asia
Human rights
The UN, OIC, international organisations and the International Criminal Court
All FCO business in the House of Lords

At the Department for Communities and Local Government Lady Warsi worked with religious and community leaders to promote faith, religious tolerance and stronger communities within the UK.

Islamic finance
Warsi established and co-chaired HM Government's first  Ministerial Task Force on Islamic Finance.

She said that the industry is worth around $1.85 trillion (£1.15 trillion) globally, with growth rates of up to 15 percent each year. She argued "with billions of pounds in reported assets, and with the world's financial capital, the UK is an increasingly important global player in the Islamic finance". Iconic buildings like London's Shard have been given life with the help of Islamic finance, and London is home to a growing number of banks, law firms and other service providers with expertise in the sector.

Added to this she argued "is Britain’s wider business offer. From our legal system and regulatory framework to our time-zone and track record of innovation, the UK is rightly seen as a partner of choice". She said the Government was determined to play its part in the development of the Islamic finance market. This is why the Prime Minister announced that we want to become the first country outside the Islamic world to issue an Islamic bond, a sukuk. She argues Britain is "a first class destination for trade and investment" and she is determined to "cement Britain's position as the leading player for Islamic finance". At the World Islamic Economic Forum, the UK Government announced that Warsi would chair a new Global Islamic Finance and Investment Group.

Persecution of Christians

In a public speech at Washington D.C. in 2013, Warsi stated, "there are parts of the world today where to be a Christian is to put your life in danger. From continent to continent, Christians are facing discrimination, ostracism, torture, even murder, simply for the faith they follow."

Declaring it a "global crisis", Warsi made the case for an international response, calling for a "cross-faith, cross-continent unity on this issue – for a response which isn't itself sectarian. Because a bomb going off in a Pakistani church shouldn't just reverberate through Christian communities; it should stir the world."

Views

Gay rights
The gay rights organisation Stonewall, as well as several Labour politicians, questioned her suitability for a high-profile Conservative Party role, owing to leaflets issued during her 2005 election campaign that contained views which they said were homophobic. Some of her 2005 campaign leaflets claimed that Labour's lowering of the homosexual age of consent from 18 to 16, under the Sexual Offences (Amendment) Act 2000, was "allowing schoolchildren to be propositioned for homosexual relationships", and that homosexuality was being "peddled" to children as young as seven in schools.

On a 2009 episode of Question Time episode featuring Nick Griffin of the British National Party (see Immigration section below), Warsi said of same-sex civil partnerships, "I think that people who want to be in a relationship together, in the form of a civil partnership, absolutely have the right to do that." Speaking in December 2013 at a BNP Paribas event in support for the Kaleidoscope Trust, she apologised for her leaflets and said the Conservative Party had been "on the wrong side of history" on gay rights.

Immigration
On immigration, Warsi declared that people who back the British National Party (BNP) may have a point: "They have some very legitimate views. People who say, 'we are concerned about crime and justice in our communities – we are concerned about immigration in our communities'". On 22 October 2009, Warsi represented the Conservatives on a controversial edition of Question Time marking the first ever appearance of Nick Griffin, leader of the BNP.

Islam

On 30 November 2009, Warsi was pelted with eggs by a group of Muslims during a walkabout in Luton. The protesters accused her of not being a proper Muslim and of supporting the death of Muslims in Afghanistan. Warsi told the BBC that these men were "idiots who did not represent the majority of British Muslims". She later continued her walkabout with a police escort.

In the context of the United Kingdom debate over veils, a Tory MP proposed banning burqas in public in 2010. Warsi responded that the garment does not limit women from engaging in everyday life. Amid critics who say the burqa is divisive and has no place in British society, she argued that the choice of what to wear should be down to the individual.

Warsi argued against following the example of France by banning Muslim women from wearing the veil, as this was "not the British way"; she said "that allowing people to wear what they want was the basis of a free society". She added: "I think I would be as offended if I was told 'actually you must wear a miniskirt to work because that's what we like women to wear' as I would be if somebody came to me and said 'we want you to be covered from head to toe because that's what we like woman to wear'." However, she also insisted that those who choose to wear garments such as the full-face veil must accept that there are some situations in which it is not appropriate, and some jobs they might not be able to do.

Warsi received support in her stance from Tory colleague and Immigration Minister, Damian Green who said banning the face veil would be "un-British" and would be at odds with Britain's "tolerant and mutually respectful society".

In 2009, she was named as "Britain's most powerful Muslim woman" by an Equality and Human Rights Commission panel and in 2010 as one of the world's "500 most influential Muslims" by the Royal Islamic Strategic Studies Centre, a Middle East think tank.

She once said: "But today ladies and gentlemen I want to focus on an aspect of my identity that I have rarely mentioned publicly: my Sunni-Shia upbringing. The diversity of my religious teaching and the inquisitive approach to religion that was encouraged in our home. As a child Ashura was as much as part of my life as regular attendance at a Deobandi mosque."

In the April 2016 issue of Dabiq Magazine, The Islamic State of Iraq and the Levant declared her a murtadd (or apostate) for being among a group of "overt crusaders" who "directly involve themselves in politics and enforcing the laws of kufr".

European Union
On 20 June 2016, three days before the referendum on membership of the European Union, Warsi said that she could no longer support the Leave campaign because of what she claimed was its xenophobia, and would vote to remain within the EU. A spokesman for Vote Leave said that they were not aware that Warsi had ever been a supporter.

Islamophobia

In May 2018, Warsi, who had been raising the issue of Islamophobia within the party for more than two years, stated that the Prime Minister, Theresa May should publicly acknowledge that Islamophobia is a problem in the Conservative Party and that the party was in denial about the problem. In a statement she said: "Up to now, sadly, there are certain parts of the party that have been in denial about this issue." She told Business Insider: "It's very widespread. It exists right from the grassroots, all the way up to the top" and claimed Conservative leaders are not taking the problem seriously because "they don't think it is going to damage them because that community doesn't vote for them in any great numbers."

In July that year, a week after the Muslim Council of Britain repeated its call for an independent inquiry into Islamophobia and accused the Conservatives of turning a blind eye to Islamophobia claims, Warsi called on the Conservatives to launch a "full independent inquiry" into Islamophobia in the party and warned the Conservatives were pursuing a politically damaging policy of denial about the problem in its own ranks. She accused Conservative Chair Brandon Lewis of a "woefully inept" response to recent complaints and added that MP Zac Goldsmith should receive "mandatory diversity training" following his unsuccessful attempt to beat Sadiq Khan to become Mayor of London.

Church and society

In September 2010, during the visit of Pope Benedict XVI to England and Scotland, Warsi said the Labour Government appeared to have viewed religion as "essentially a rather quaint relic of our pre-industrial history. They were also too suspicious of faith's potential for contributing to society – behind every faith-based charity, they sensed the whiff of conversion and exclusivity. And because of these prejudices they didn't create policies to unleash the positive power of faith in our society."

She returned to this theme, as a Cabinet minister, in February 2012, saying "Britain is under threat from a rising tide of militant secularisation", before an official visit to the Vatican to mark the 30th anniversary of the re-establishment of full diplomatic ties between the UK and the Vatican.

She added, "I am not calling for some kind of 21st century theocracy. Religious faith and its followers do not have the only answer. There will be times when politicians and faith leaders will disagree. What is more, secularism is not intrinsically damaging. My concern is when secularisation is pushed to an extreme, when it requires the complete removal of faith from the public sphere". A Muslim herself, Warsi says that Europe needs to be "more confident and more comfortable in its Christianity".

On the Church of England, she insists she had "no doubts whatsoever" about maintaining its position as the Established Church, describing it as a "bedrock" of society. She believes "the system works": "We have an Established Church", it has "a unique position" and an "obligation to all of its parishioners irrespective of their faith". She thinks "it is an incredibly positive aspect of our life in Britain and long may it continue."

In November 2013, Warsi told an audience at the University of Cambridge that faith was being put back at the "heart of government", as it had been under Winston Churchill and Margaret Thatcher. The Coalition, she argued, is one of the "most pro-faith governments in the West ... More often than not, people who do God do good." She said that religious groups must be allowed to provide public services without the State being "suspicious of their motives". Quoting Thatcher she said, "I wonder whether the State services would have done as much for the man who fell among thieves as the Good Samaritan did for him?"

Resignation

On 5 August 2014, Warsi resigned from the Government citing concerns that she was no longer able to support the Cameron Government's policy on the escalation of violence in the Israel–Gaza conflict, describing the Government's position as "morally indefensible". In her resignation letter, Warsi wrote that the UK Government's "approach and language during the current crisis in Gaza is morally indefensible, is not in Britain’s national interest and will have a long-term detrimental impact on our reputation internationally and domestically" and that it was "not consistent with the rule of law and our long support for international justice".

Warsi criticised the British Government by saying it could "only play a constructive role in solving the Middle East crisis if it is an honest broker and at the moment I do not think it is." She explained: "Our position not to recognise Palestinian statehood at the UN in November 2012 placed us on the wrong side of history and is something I deeply regret not speaking out against at the time."

After resigning she called for an arms embargo against Israel: "It appalls me that the British Government continues to allow the sale of weapons to a country, Israel, that has killed almost 2,000 people, including hundreds of kids, in the past four weeks alone. The arms exports to Israel must stop."

The Daily Telegraph said that her resignation was a blow to the Prime Minister David Cameron as it highlights divisions within Conservative MPs about criticising Israel for the high levels of civilian deaths in Gaza. Her resignation letter praised ministers that had lost their positions in the recent Cabinet reshuffle: William Hague whom she called "one of the finest Foreign Secretaries this country has seen", and Kenneth Clarke and Dominic Grieve as strong upholders of international law.  She expressed concern about the way recent decisions were made in the Foreign Office.

While calling her decision "bold", Time magazine wrote that her whole story is rooted in commitment to a higher calling, further adding that "It makes her decision to resign all the more dramatic, and it sends a strong statement that political will requires moral courage". Time quoted Warsi: "I always said that long after life in politics I must be able to live with myself for the decision I took or the decisions I supported ... By staying in Government at this time I do not feel I can be sure of that", she wrote in her resignation letter. The magazine concluded that she may have resigned, but that does not mean her voice had been silenced, and that it might, in fact, grow louder as a result.

The Guardian called her an 'uncomfortable fit in Tory ranks', adding that her appointment to David Cameron's first top team was seen as an attempt to broaden the party's appeal to women and minorities; but from the beginning, Warsi's rapid rise was viewed with suspicion by some in the Party's grassroots and the rightwing press, who regarded her position as tokenistic. The paper claimed that in the early days, Warsi had genuine influence on Conservative policy, helping the party formulate its thinking on extremism and speaking out frequently against what she saw as an increase in prejudice against faith, especially Islamophobia; however, the paper continued, her star began to fall among the Tory hierarchy some years before mainly because of unpopularity with the old guard and a series of outspoken gaffes that annoyed the spin doctors.

In an editorial, Pakistani newspaper The Express Tribune admired Warsi's decision to resign on a matter of principle. The paper also stated that her resignation was going to further aggravate internal tensions and that Tory grandees, who had long disliked and resented her, were already briefing against her, accusing her, among other things, of being a Hamas sympathiser. The paper termed her resignation over the Israeli actions in Gaza as having far-reaching implications for the British Government, and that she remained a potent figure on the UK political stage.

Writing in The Guardian, journalist Michael White claimed that Warsi should gain some support in the British Muslim community for putting her job where her mouth is over Gaza, further adding, "This is the first time that I can recall a senior Muslim politician, even one who is an unelected patronage appointee, throwing some community weight around ...."

Controversies

Roger Helmer defection
In March 2012, Warsi was criticised by a number of Conservative MPs at a meeting of the 1922 Committee for her handling of MEP Roger Helmer's defection to UKIP. A witness to the meeting said, "She had a very very tough time. She got it with both barrels from MPs across the party. For the Party Chairman to get treated like that shows what people think of the Party Chairman." Another is reported to have said, "I just thought she was out of her depth. I have never seen anything like it – other than the last time she was before the 1922 Committee. I genuinely think she is the worst chairman we have ever had."

Financial declarations
In May 2012, Warsi apologised for failing to declare rental income in the Lords' Register of Interests. Declaring the fact of income, but not the amount, is necessary for rental income over £5,000.

Parliamentary expenses inquiry
On 27 May 2012, criticisms of her claims for parliamentary expenses were reported. The Labour Opposition urged a full police investigation into her expenses after it was alleged that she claimed up to £2,000 in rent despite staying rent-free in the London home of a Conservative Party donor, Dr Wafik Moustafa. Moustafa claims that he received no money from Warsi. Though he stated it was not personal, Moustafa was in a political dispute with Warsi concerning the Conservative Arab Network.

Labour MP John Mann expressed his intention to refer these claims to the Lords Commissioner for Standards, but Warsi pre-empted this by referring them herself.

Breach of the Ministerial Code
Sir Alex Allan found Warsi to have twice breached the Ministerial Code, though he concluded these were minor and noted that she had apologised. The first was in relation to a trip to Pakistan where she failed to declare that she was being accompanied by a business partner but Sir Alex found that even were Baroness Warsi to have declared the relationship it would not have prevented the trip from going ahead. The second was when she invited her business partner (Abid Hussain) to meet David Cameron at a Number 10 Downing Street Eid event.

The Conservative Party leadership was criticised in some quarters for holding Baroness Warsi to account on the Ministerial Code while apparently having a more relaxed approach to Jeremy Hunt, who was Culture Secretary at that time. Following the publication of the report, David Cameron said Baroness Warsi would remain in her job.

Awards and nominations
In January 2015, Warsi was nominated for the Muslim Woman of the Year award at the British Muslim Awards.

Honours
 She was given a Life Peerage on 11 October 2007 allowing her to sit in the House of Lords. She sits on the Conservative Party Benches. She was introduced in the House of Lords on 15 October 2007. She took the title of Baroness Warsi, of Dewsbury in the County of West Yorkshire.

Commonwealth honours
 Commonwealth honours

Foreign honours
 Foreign honours

Scholastic
 University degrees

 Chancellor, visitor, governor, and fellowships

Honorary degrees

Memberships and fellowships

Personal life

At the age of 15, when on holiday with her extended family in Pakistan, a number of boys were introduced to her, and from them she chose her cousin Naeem. They married in 1990 and had one daughter, Aamna. Naeem later denied that the marriage had been arranged. They divorced in December 2007.

Warsi describes herself as a "Northern working-class mum". She is a member of the Carlton Club, and a shareholder of Rupert's Recipes Limited and Shire Bed Company. On 20 August 2009, she married Iftikhar Azam in a Nikah ceremony at her parents' house in Dewsbury. The couple live in Wakefield with their five children.

She set up the Baroness Warsi Foundation to fund projects that seek to improve social mobility, increase gender equality and promote religious understanding.

Television appearances
In December 2016, Warsi took a cameo role in the BBC One sitcom Citizen Khan. In May 2018, October 2020 and again in May and November 2021she was a panellist on BBC's Have I Got News For You.

In December 2020 Warsi was featured in the BBC series Winter Walks, walking along Wharfedale, from Starbotton, through Kettlewell, to Conistone.

In February 2021 Warsi appeared in the Channel 4 show Stand Up & Deliver, where she took on the challenge of becoming a stand-up comedian in aid of Stand Up to Cancer.  She has also featured in an episode of Channel 4's Scotland: Escape to the Wilderness.

In 2022 she appeared as one of 5 contestants in the Taskmaster New Year Treat special.

In 2022 she appeared alongside Alistair Campbell as one of the political experts on Channel 4s Make Me Prime Minister, a show in which 12 people compete against each other for a cash prize by creating a policy platform that gets them voted as Britain's alternative Prime Minister.

See also
 List of British Pakistanis

Notes

References

External links

 Sayeeda Warsi Official website
 Profile at the Cabinet Office
 Profile at the Conservative Party

 Profile: Sayeeda Warsi, BBC News, 2 July 2007
 Sayeeda Warsi: Cameron's secret weapon, The Sunday Times, 3 October 2009
 Britain's first Asian Cabinet Minister, BBC World Service, 3 June 2010 (26 minute audio interview)
 Debrett's People of Today
 profile in the Daily Telegraph, 16 January 2012

|-

|-

|-

|-

1971 births
Living people
20th-century English lawyers
21st-century English lawyers
Alumni of the University of Leeds
Alumni of The University of Law
British special advisers
British politicians of Pakistani descent
Chairmen of the Conservative Party (UK)
Conservative Party (UK) life peers
Conservative Party (UK) parliamentary candidates
English Muslims
English people of Pakistani descent
English solicitors
Female members of the Cabinet of the United Kingdom
Life peeresses created by Elizabeth II
Government ministers of the United Kingdom
Members of the Privy Council of the United Kingdom
People from Dewsbury
Politicians from Yorkshire
Punjabi people
Punjabi women